Tønnessen is a surname. Notable people with the surname include:

Anne Tønnessen (born 1974), Norwegian footballer 
Herman Tønnessen (1918–2001), Norwegian–Canadian philosopher and writer
Johan Nicolay Tønnessen (1901–1987), Norwegian historian and schoolteacher

Norwegian-language surnames